Black Metal is an album by British musician Dean Blunt, released by Rough Trade Records on 3 November 2014. The album features vocals from Blunt and frequent collaborator Joanne Robertson. Musically, Black Metal features more traditional pop song structures than Blunt's previous work, but is diverse in instrumentation and genre. The album includes elements of indie pop, folk pop, Americana, dub, ambient, grime, drone, and dancehall. Critics have also noted the prose of Blunt's lyrics as being similar to contemporary hip hop lyrics, which often reflect that of dark subjects like infidelity and alcoholism.

Blunt has stated that the album was inspired by what he sees as black artistic liberation away from the appropriation of 'existing/old white images' (a la names like Black Elvis, Black Cobain) toward 'something that is undefined and is new'. The lead-out grooves of each side of the vinyl version feature the first four letters of the Supreme Alphabet of the Nation of Gods and Earths.

In June 2021, Blunt released a sequel album, Black Metal 2.

Critical reception

Black Metal currently has a score of 79 on Metacritic, indicating "generally favorable reviews". Critics praised Blunt's emotional range and directness on the album. In a review for The Observer, Killian Fox wrote that Blunt had created "some of the most achingly beautiful music recorded this year." Writing for Pitchfork, Colin Joyce called the album "disjointed" but praised the album for its sound and for Blunt's clearer, more pop-oriented style compared to his previous work. However, AllMusic's Andy Kellman criticised the album for being "quantity-over-quality" and for what Kellman saw as a derivative sound. Michael Hann characterised the album in The Guardian as a needlessly difficult listen that was sometimes repetitive, but nonetheless praised it as "extraordinary."

Accolades
Black Metal placed first on Tiny Mix Tapes and Crack Magazines lists of best albums from 2014. The latter publication also named it the best album of the 2010s.

Track listing

Notes
 All tracks are stylized in all caps. For example, "Lush" is stylized as "LUSH".

Sample credits
  "Lush" contains a sample of "For You", written by Stephens and performed by Big Star.
  "100" contains a sample of "Over My Shoulder", written by McRobbie and performed by The Pastels.

References

2014 albums
Rough Trade Records albums
Art pop albums